Stankiella is a genus of harvestmen in the family Phalangiidae.

Species
 Stankiella montana Hadzi, 1973
 Stankiella pretneri Hadzi, 1973

References

Harvestmen
Harvestman genera